The 1950 FA Cup final was the 69th final of the FA Cup. It took place on 29 April 1950 at Wembley Stadium and was contested between Arsenal and Liverpool.

Arsenal won the match 2–0 to win the FA Cup for the third time, with both goals scored by Reg Lewis. The Arsenal team also featured cricketer Denis Compton, who played alongside his brother Leslie. Liverpool dropped future manager Bob Paisley for the match, even though he had scored against Merseyside rivals Everton in the semi-final.

Match details

References
General
FA Cup Final kits, 1950–59
Specific

LFC History Match Report 

FA Cup Finals
FA Cup Final
FA Cup Final 1950
FA Cup Final 1950
FA Cup Final
FA Cup Final